CB-1 could refer to one of three things:

, a "large cruiser"/battlecruiser that served in the U.S. Navy during World War II.
Honda CB-1, a small sportsbike.
Hatz CB-1, a 1960s light biplane that was designed by John Hatz.